Bertrand Dermoncourt (born March 1970) is a French journalist, publisher and author of books on music, including classical music. He started in rock fanzines during the 1980s. In 1998, he co-founded the magazine Classica of which he was from the beginning Editorial Director Musical critic of the weekly l'Express, he also directs a collection of biographies of composers published by Actes Sud He is also a member of the editorial board of the collection "Bouquins" at Éditions Robert Laffont and member of the Prix Pelléas jury. 

At the request of the President of the Republic, Emmanuel Macron, he was artistic advisor for the "Année Debussy" on the occasion of the celebrations marking the centenary of the composer's death in 2018. After leaving Classica, he was appointed director of music at Radio Classique in March 2018.

Publications

Books 
 1997: David Bowie, Prélude et Fugue, Paris, 128 pages
 1998: Depeche mode, Prélude et Fugue, Paris, 128 pages
 1998: The Cure, Prélude et Fugue, Paris, 128 pages
 2001: The Cure de A à Z, L'Étudiant, Paris, 126 pages
 2002: Sonic Youth de A à Z , Prélude et Fugue, Paris, 128 pages
 2005: Depeche Mode de A à Z , Éditions L'Express, Paris, 111 pages
 2005: David Bowie de A à Z, Éditions L'Express, Paris, 119 pages
 2005: The Cure de A à Z, Éditions L'Express, Paris, 117 pages
 2006: Tout Mozart : Encyclopédie de A à Z (direction), series "Bouquins", Robert Laffont, Paris, 1093 pages
 2006: Dimitri Chostakovitch, Actes Sud, Arles, 238 pages
 2009: Tout Bach (direction), Robert Laffont, series "Bouquins", Paris, 895 pages
 2012: L’Univers de l’opéra. Œuvres, scènes, compositeurs, interprètes (direction), Robert Laffont, collection "Bouquins", Paris, 1214 pages
 2012: La Discothèque idéale de la musique classique (direction), Actes Sud, Arles, 284 pages
 2013: Igor Stravinski, Actes Sud, Arles, 205 pages
 2013: Tout Verdi, Robert Laffont, series "Bouquins", Paris, 850 pages
 2013: La Discothèque idéale de l’opéra (direction), Actes Sud, Arles, 308 pages
 2014: Michka Assayas, Le Nouveau Dictionnaire du rock (collaboration), Robert Laffont, series "Bouquins", Paris, 3792 pages
 2014: Berlin, Histoire, promenades, anthologie et dictionnaire (collaboration), Robert Laffont, series "Bouquins", Paris, 1152 pages
 2015: Stefan Zweig, Le retour de Gustav Mahler (introduction), Actes Sud, Arles, 58 pages
2015: David Bowie, foreword by Éric Dahan, Actes Sud, coll. « Rocks » dirigée par Bertrand Burgalat, Arles, 2015
2018: Valery Gergiev, Rencontre. Entretiens, Actes Sud, 2018

References

External links 
 Bertrand Dermoncourt at Actes Sud

French music critics
1970 births
Living people
21st-century French journalists
Male journalists
French magazine editors